Alberto M. Carvalho MedM is a Portuguese-American educator and the superintendent of the Los Angeles Unified School District. He previously served as superintendent of Miami-Dade County Public Schools (M-DCPS), the fourth-largest school district in the United States, with over 346,000 students and 52,000 employees. He was appointed superintendent in September 2008. In February 2014, the American Association of School Administrators (AASA) named Carvalho the 2014 National Superintendent of the Year. On February 28, 2018, New York City Mayor Bill de Blasio named Carvalho as the city's next Department of Education Chancellor, but he refused the offer the following day.

On December 9, 2021, he accepted the position of Los Angeles Unified School District’s next superintendent following the resignation of Austin Beutner.

Early life and education 
Carvalho was born in Portugal to a father who worked as a custodian and mother who worked as a seamstress. He was one of six children and the only one to graduate high school. He described growing up there in "pretty dramatic poverty,” living "in a one-room apartment with no running water and no electricity."

He came to the United States after high school in the early 1980s. As an undocumented immigrant, he worked mostly in construction and restaurants (as a dishwasher) and was homeless for a time.

Carvalho attended Broward College and then Barry University, where in 1990 he graduated with a bachelor's degree in biology.

Career 

Carvalho began his career in education as a physics, chemistry, and calculus teacher at Miami Jackson Senior High. He later became an assistant principal at the school. He also worked as principal, chief communications officer, a school district lobbyist, and assistant superintendent before being named superintendent to lead the Miami-Dade County Public School district in 2008. At the time of his appointment, the district was reported to have been near bankruptcy. Carvalho worked to cut the budget by $2 billion, firing "massive numbers of administrators" but not one classroom teacher. He has described his approach as "zero-based, moral-values-based" budgeting.

In 2010, Carvalho was appointed the chairman of a taskforce aimed at improving teaching quality throughout Miami. Carvalho controversially "franchised" MAST Academy, opening three new schools based on the original Virginia Key institution. In 2012, Carvalho served as President of the Association of Latino Administrators and Superintendents and is currently on the Board of Directors of The Children's Trust. Carvalho remains self-appointed principal of two schools that he opened: Primary Learning Center (2009), an elementary school, and iPreparatory Academy (2010), an experimental high school that he has called "my signature school."

Carvalho's career has not been without controversy. He was implicated in a romantic relationship with Tania deLuzuriaga in 2008, a former Miami Herald education reporter while he was married. Many were disappointed when he didn't punish teachers responsible in a large test cheating scandal. Carvalho has also been criticized for his somewhat pompous persona, theatrical presentation style, and self-promotion.

Awards and recognition 
In 2011, Carvalho was named one of the nation's Top 10 Tech-Savvy Superintendents by eSchool News. Under Carvalho's leadership as superintendent, the Miami-Dade County Public Schools won the Broad Prize for Urban Education in 2012. The district has also won awards for marked improvement in Advanced Placement participation and performance. In December 2013, he was named Florida's Superintendent of the Year. In February 2014, Carvalho was named the 2014 AASA National Superintendent of the Year during the organization's National Conference on Education. In May 2014, he was honored by President Barack Obama at a ceremony at the White House, along with the National Teacher of the Year and Principal of the Year winners.

He was also appointed to the National Assessment Governing Board by outgoing U.S. Secretary of Education Arne Duncan on October 6, 2015. The governing board sets policy for the National Assessment of Educational Progress, tests children take across the U.S. The tests, also known as NAEP, are often called “The Nation’s Report Card." In 2016, Carvalho was named the winner of the Harold W. McGraw, Jr. Prize in Education for K-12. He was also named the 2016 Magnet Schools of America (MSA) Superintendent of the Year.

Carvalho has been awarded several honorary degrees including a Doctor of Public Service by Florida International University; Doctor of Humane Letters by both Barry University and Florida Memorial University; and a Doctor of Pedagogy, Honoris Causa from Nova Southeastern University.

References

1964 births
Living people
School superintendents in California
School superintendents in Florida
Place of birth missing (living people)
Portuguese emigrants to the United States
20th-century American educators
21st-century American educators
Broward College alumni
Barry University alumni
Undocumented immigrants to the United States
American school principals
Los Angeles Unified School District superintendents